VVA/Spartaan is a Dutch amateur  football club from the Amsterdam borough of Amsterdam-West in the neighborhood Bos en Lommer, founded in 1901. The club hold both a Saturday and a Sunday team, with both competing in the Derde Klasse.

History
The club was founded on 1 July 1988 as a fusion of two clubs VVA (founded on 22 September 1901) and De Spartaan (founded on 20 April 1903). Both teams had previously competed in the top league during their history, while both teams reached the KNVB Cup final in their own right as well. VVA in 1918 and De Spartaan in 1926 and in 1937. The club also has an indoor Futsal team, as well as a full youth system.

Honours
KNVB District Cup West I (Sunday clubs)
1965*, 1968*

* De Spartaan

References

External links 
 VVA/Spartaan Official website

Football clubs in the Netherlands
Association football clubs established in 1901
Football clubs in Amsterdam
1901 establishments in the Netherlands